is a four-panel manga series by Enokizu. It appeared as a serial in the web magazine Manga Goccha, and the manga magazine Megami from October 14, 2010 to April 22, 2015. Micro Magazine owns the web magazine, and is also the publisher of the series which spanned seven bound volumes released from 2012 to 2015. Kotoura-san is about a first year high school girl named Haruka Kotoura who has the ability to read minds. Growing up she has a horrible life but things turn around when she makes friends who accept her ability. One guy in particular named Yoshihisa Manabe also eventually takes a romantic interest in her.

An anime television adaptation was made from the manga by AIC Classic that aired from January 11 to March 29, 2013. Twelve episodes aired in all and included the addition of five bonus shorts called . Outside of Japan only the anime adaptation was brought over and released in North America. The series was licensed under the name The Troubled Life of Miss Kotoura by NIS America, they released a Blu-ray subtitled collection on August 4, 2015. The English subtitled release received mixed to mostly positive reviews from critics.

Plot
Haruka Kotoura is a 15-year-old girl who was born with the psychic ability to read minds. As a child she blurts out what people around her are thinking, too young to realize that these thoughts are the person's true feelings which upsets them when they are revealed in public. She is branded a compulsive liar by her teachers, ridiculed by her classmates and loses all of her friends. The strain gets to be too much on her parents as well after she inadvertently exposes that they are both having romantic affairs. Abandoned by her mother into the care of her grandfather Haruka becomes a recluse, distancing herself from everyone, concluding that she only brings people bad luck.

Things start to change when she starts high school and meets Yoshihisa Manabe. He is shown to be unfazed by Haruka's mind-reading ability but also has a perverted imagination. Yoshihisa offers her his friendship and vows to stand by her side regardless of the circumstances. He helps her make new friends and together they form the school's ESP Research Club. Haruka's life begins to change completely for the better which gives her newfound strength she never had. She is eventually able to overcome the teasing she has endured, and face her mother regarding her past. The series concludes with her confessing her love to Yoshihisa with support from her friends.

Characters

Main characters

Haruka is a fifteen year old girl who was born with the psychic ability to read minds at a young age. She becomes an outcast by her friends/classmates when she starts blurting out their thoughts, not realizing that these are their true feelings that they may or may not want revealed. Her mother eventually abandons her when she obliviously exposes an affair between own parents. This causes Haruka to conclude that she only brings people trouble, and the best way to prevent hurting herself and/or others is to close her heart to people. When she enters high school she meets a guy named Yoshihisa Manabe who accepts her mind reading ability. He helps her make friends which gradually makes Haruka a stronger person. She is vulnerable though to Yoshihisa's lewd fantasies which causes her to become incredibly flustered when teased. Over the series she develops romantic feelings for Manabe and the two confess their love for one another at the end of the series.

Yoshihisa is one of Haruka's classmates who isn't bothered by her ability to read his mind. He is a guy with a big heart but frequently has lewd thoughts about Haruka which he uses to tease her. He is shown to truly love Haruka though whom he deeply cares for. Yoshihisa tries his best to understand her problem while struggling to deepen their relationship. He later forms an unlikely bond with Haruka's grandfather Zenzou, who encourages his perverted side in order to get his granddaughter married. Yoshihisa finally confesses his love to Haruka in the end after being playfully scolded for not saying it sooner.

Yuriko is the president, and creator of the school's ESP Research Club. She invites Haruka upon learning about her ability to join, but initially also has an ulterior motive for doing so. She is fixated on vindicating her mother and her family after her psychic mother committed suicide. The media had accused her of being a fake, so she ended her life to escape the constant ridicule, leaving young Yuriko devastated. Yuriko finds an opportunity in Haruka and shows her only the thoughts she wants her to see. During the series she considers Haruka a true friend which leads her to recognize how selfish she was to which she is forgiven. Yuriko also has unrequited feelings for Daichi Muroto, her childhood friend.

Daichi is the ESP Research Club's vice president, and Mifune's childhood friend. He is known for his short height and intelligence with things having to do with technology. Daichi is also surprisingly adept at investigation which he uses to see behind Yuriko's plans. While he doesn't interfere with her intentions, he does try to give her advice on how to move forward. Deep down he is shown to be a sensitive person who can "empathize well with others". Mifune shows strong romantic feelings towards him, but he is oblivious to her affection.

Hiyori is Yoshihisa's childhood friend and classmate, often nicknamed Moriya. She is in deeply in love with Yoshihisa and initially resents Haruka for gaining his attention and becoming romantically interested in Haruka, rather than herself. After Yoshihisa makes her realize what she has done to Haruka, Hiyori reconciles with Haruka and befriends her, even later joining the ESP Research Club. Out of the three girls in the ESP Society, she is the only one who cannot cook. She occasionally has a fearsome aura like a demon that is used to keep Yoshihisa's perversion in check, but she has a habit of panicking in the face of adversity despite her practices in martial arts. She owns her own dojo which lead to bullying when she was younger.

Supporting characters

Haruka's very wealthy grandfather. One of the few people to stick by her after Kumiko disowned her. He is slightly perverted, having dirty thoughts about his kinship with Haruka.

A monk who is a family friend at a shrine temple in Haruka's hometown. His encounter with Haruka has led to him taken an interest in esper abilities.

Haruka's mother. Initially kind-hearted and caring, she becomes more and more stressed because she can't understand Haruka's special ability or deal with the situations it inadvertently caused. She reacted to her husband's increasing emotional distance by cheating on him, and when it is discovered that Haruka's father was also unfaithful, they divorce. She deals with her moral failings and weakness of character by rejecting young Haruka and disowning her. She mentally apologises to Haruka and calls herself a ‘Weak Mother.’ Kumiko utterly regretted disowning Haruka, blaming herself again and again. At the end of the series, she reconciles with Haruka after they both get all their pent-up feeling out of their system.

A police detective. He appears to be familiar with the events that occurred surrounding Yuriko's mother, although he himself is skeptic of supernatural abilities.

Detective Ishiyama's partner who is a bit clumsy and usually hungry. During her childhood, she was bullied a lot because of her height, which caused her to develop a violent split personality. Tsukino later began attacking high school girls under the influence of her other personality and soon targeted Haruka. However, Haruka was able to get her feelings across to the true Tsukino, who overcomes her other side and turns herself in.

Media

Manga
The original manga by Enokizu began serialization in Micro Magazine's Manga Goccha magazine from October 14, 2011. Seven tankōbon volumes were released between 2012 and 2015.

Anime
An anime adaptation by AIC Classic aired in Japan between January 11 and March 29, 2013 and was simulcast by Crunchyroll. There is an insert song in episode 11 titled  sung by Megumi Nakajima. NIS America has licensed the series in North America under the title The Troubled Life of Miss Kotoura and released a subtitled Blu-ray collection on August 4, 2015.

Bonus episodes
 is a series of introductory web episodes that were streamed online between December 7, 2012 and January 11, 2013.

Reception
The English subtitled release of Kotoura-san (aka: The Troubled Life of Miss Kotoura) received various reviews from sources that do reviews for anime. Theron Martin from Anime News Network gave the series a B+ rating saying that while some may find the opening 10 minutes "overkill", the series is a great mix of "effectively funny, sincere, and heartfelt content". Martin also praised the musical score, but called the artwork mediocre. Chris Beveridge from The Fandom Post also gave the series a B+ rating saying that it has "a lot going for it". Beveridge points out that it is engaging to watch how Haruka comes out of her indescribable childhood with a largely positive attitude. While she doesn't do it alone, he says that there are many moments where she "stands for herself" in order to do things she wouldn't normally do. Tim Jones from THEM anime reviews gave the series a "very low" 2/5 star rating calling it rushed with no pacing at all. In his review he criticized the usual high school troupes such as "festivals, beaches, fights, perverted male fantasy sequences, and parent troubles", and goes on to say that many of the characters' arcs are left "unfinished or just brushed off".

Some reviewers did not review the entire series; Matthew Lee from Screen Anarchy reviewed the first four episodes. He called the opening to the series the "best ever" saying that it does more storytelling in those ten minutes than other shows may do in an entire season. Lee goes on to say that the odd genre mix of 1950s science fiction, and oversexed high-school comedy are used to make the series worth watching. Andy Hanley from UK Anime Network gave the first three episodes a 4 out of 10 rating calling them "relentlessly depressing". To the converse of the previous review, Hanley said that the first twenty minutes were "genuinely horrible to watch", he goes on to say that the "half baked" comedy doesn't make up for the depression.

References

External links
Official website 
Official anime website 

2010 manga
2010s webcomics
2013 anime television series debuts
2013 Japanese television series endings
2015 webcomic endings
Anime and manga telepaths
Anime International Company
Anime series based on manga
Comedy-drama anime and manga
Japanese comedy webcomics
Post-traumatic stress disorder in fiction
Romance webcomics
Romantic comedy anime and manga
Seinen manga
Supernatural anime and manga
Television shows based on Japanese webcomics
Webcomics in print
Yonkoma